Pedro de Verona Rodrigues Pires (born 29 April 1934) is a Cape Verdean politician who served as Prime Minister of Cape Verde from 1975 to 1991, and later as President from 2001 to 2011.

Life and career
Pires was born in São Filipe, Fogo, Cape Verde to Luís Rodrigues Pires and wife Maria Fidalga Lopes. Later, he studied at Liceu Gil Eanes (Old High School) and Escola Jorge Barbosa in Mindelo during the 1950s and later abroad at the University of Lisbon in Portugal at the Faculty of Sciences.  He fled to Conakry in 1962, then Ghana and afterwards headed to Algeria; he was trained in Cuba, the Soviet Union and Guinea-Bissau. He attended the Second PAIGC Congress in 1973. Before independence, he returned to Praia, Cape Verde on a Portuguese military ship on October 13, 1974.

Prime Minister
Three days after the country became independent in 1975, he became the first Prime Minister of Cape Verde; the nation at the time was a one-party state under the rule of the African Party for the Independence of Cape Verde (PAICV).  He opposed apartheid in South Africa and opposed foreign intervention in Africa. On October 20–22, 1980, he visited Paris. He visited that city again in 1989 and met with French Prime Minister Michel Rocard on 11 May 1989. He held additional portfolio of Minister of Finance from 1986 to 1990.

After the ruling PAICV decided to institute multiparty democracy in February 1990, Pires replaced President Aristides Pereira as General Secretary of PAICV in August 1990. The PAICV lost the multiparty parliamentary and presidential elections held in early 1991 and was left in opposition.

After being Prime Minister
At a party congress in August 1993, Pires was replaced as General Secretary by Aristides Lima and was instead elected as President of PAICV. As a candidate for the party presidency at PAICV's September 1997 congress, he faced José Maria Neves and prevailed with 68% of the vote. He stepped down as PAICV President in 2000 in preparation for a presidential bid in the next year's election and he was succeeded by Neves. He officially announced his candidacy for the Presidency of Cape Verde on September 5, 2000.

Pires was the PAICV candidate in the February 2001 presidential election, defeating former Prime Minister Carlos Veiga of the Movement for Democracy (MpD) in the second round by just 12 votes. Pires took office on March 22; the MpD boycotted his inauguration, saying that the election was marred by a "non-transparent process". As President, Pires appointed Neves as Prime Minister.

As president
On April 22, 2002, Pires was received the Grand Cross of the Order of Prince Henry of Portugal.

On June 7, 2005, the president paid hommage to Sergio Frusoni and declared him one of the Greatest Crioulo poets.

Days later on 16 and 17 June, he met and talked with the French Minister of Cooperation Brigitte Girardin in Praia for discussions with the Europe Union for obtaining special status, fight against insecurity.

When he was president, in October 2005, he visited Brazil, the capital city Brasília and met the president at the time Luiz Inácio Lula da Silva.

He ran for a second term in the presidential election held on 12 February 2006 and again prevailed over Veiga, this time winning in the first round by a 51%-49% margin.

In May 2008, he said that he favored a cautious, long-term approach to the formation of a United States of Africa, preferring that regional integration precede a continent-wide union. He attended the Tokyo International Conference on African Development at this time. On March 26 and 27 2009, he met with the foreign minister José Brito, the French Minister of Immigration (which includes Solidarity Development) Éric Besson on examining projects for solidarity development.

After presidency
Pires was awarded the 2011 Mo Ibrahim Prize for Achievement in African Leadership. The prize was awarded in recognition of Pires role in making Cape Verde a "model of democracy, stability and increased prosperity". The prize includes a monetary component of $5m.

Personal life
He is married to Adélcia Barreto Pires and has two children, Sara and Indira.

Awards and decorations
 Order of Amílcar Cabral (Cape Verde)
 Grand Commander of the Order of the Republic of the Gambia, 2008
Amílcar Cabral Medal - Guinea Bissau
Order of José Martí, Cuba
Order of Christ, Portugal, in 1986
Order of Prince Henry, Portugal, in 2002
Doctor honoris causa, Lusophony University of Human Sciences, in the field of political sciences, 2011
Grand Cross of the National Order of the Lion, Senegal
  Order of East Timor, 2011

References

External links

capeverde-islands.com – Biography of President Pedro Pires

1934 births
African Party for the Independence of Cape Verde politicians
Living people
Presidents of Cape Verde
Prime Ministers of Cape Verde
Finance ministers of Cape Verde
People from Fogo, Cape Verde
University of Lisbon alumni
Recipients of orders, decorations, and medals of Senegal